Raymond Bales (born 11 June 1951) is a British former motorcycle speedway rider.

Biography
Born in Norwich, Bales is the son of former international rider Billy Bales. He took up speedway after a successful career in cycle speedway, in which he rode for Tottenham Kangaroos and also represented England. 

His first speedway experience was at Boston in 1970 and he rode in nine matches for Boston Barracudas in Division Two in 1971. He was a regular member of the Boston team in 1972 and 1973, winning the league and cup double there, and made his Division One debut for King's Lynn Stars in 1972. He rode regularly for King's Lynn in 1973 and made the move full-time in 1974, averaging over 5 points per match in the top flight between 1974 and 1976. In 1977 he moved on to Leicester Lions, where he struggled despite riding in every match, averaging below 4, and moved down to the National League with Mildenhall Fen Tigers in 1978, scoring well until the end of the 1982 season. After missing the 1983 season, he returned to Mildenhall for a final season in 1984.

Bales represented Young England against Sweden in 1973.

References

1951 births
Living people
British speedway riders
English motorcycle racers
Boston Barracudas riders
King's Lynn Stars riders
Leicester Lions riders
Mildenhall Fen Tigers riders